The 2021 Overwatch League season was the fourth season of the Overwatch League (OWL), a professional esports league for the video game Overwatch. The regular season began on April 16, 2021, and concluded on August 21. The season featured four midseason tournaments throughout the regular season along with a new point system for season playoff seeding. Similar to the 2020 season, teams are split into two geographical regions. Due to the COVID-19 pandemic, most matches were played online, with the exception of several live events throughout the season. The season marks the second year of the Overwatch League's broadcast partnership with YouTube, their third with Sport1, and their first with Bilibili.

The postseason began on September 4 with two regional play-in tournaments acting as qualifiers for the season playoffs. The playoffs began on September 21 and culminated with the Grand Finals on September 25. The Shanghai Dragons won the Grand Finals over the Atlanta Reign to win their first OWL championship.

Format

Regions and live events 
After all matches were rescheduled to be played strictly online due to the COVID-19 pandemic, the 2020 season saw the OWL divide teams into two regions, North America and Asia, in an effort to reduce lag due to online play. For the 2021 season, the twenty teams were be divided into two regions, the East and West. Eight teams from China and South Korea competed in the East Region, while twelve teams from North America and Europe competed in the West Division.

The majority of matches in the 2021 season were played online. Three live events were planned to be hosted by three teams in China: Hangzhou Spark in June, Shanghai Dragons in July, and Guangzhou Charge in August. All five China-based teams travelled to these events, while the three Korea-based teams played at the events remotely via the league's cloud server. The Charge's homestand in August was cancelled, however, due to COVID-19 concerns. Additionally, the Dallas Fuel hosted a homestand in July at Esports Stadium Arlington.

Midseason tournaments 
The league expanded upon the tournament format that was introduced in the 2020 season. Four standalone tournaments, the May Melee, June Joust, Summer Showdown, and Countdown Cup, were spread throughout the regular season with teams from both regions competing against each other. Hero pools, a system in which some heroes are unplayable, were used in two of the four tournaments: the June Joust and Countdown Cup. For each tournament, teams played four weeks of regional qualifier matches. The top six teams from the West and the top four teams from the East advanced to regional knockout matches, and the top two teams from each region advanced from the knockouts to play in the interregional tournament. In an effort to minimize lag, the qualifying Western teams traveled to the University of Hawaiʻi at Mānoa for each interregional tournament. The internet service provider at the University of Hawaii was directly connected to a cloud-based server in Tokyo, Japan via an underwater sea cable, while the qualifying Eastern teams did not travel anywhere and connected to the Tokyo server from Asia. With this setup, the league was able to equal latencies for all participating players with a "minimum-latency tool" developed by Activision.

Season playoffs 
Contrasted to previous seasons, where playoff seeding was determined by teams' win–loss record throughout the regular season, the league implemented a point system, called League Points, to determine regular season standings. Every win in the regular season earned a team one point. A first-, second-, or third-place finish in each midseason tournament earned the placing team an additional three, two, or one point, respectively. A total of eight teams advanced to the season playoffs: the top three teams from the West and the top two teams from the East, based on League Points, advanced directly to the season playoffs. Seeds four through nine in the Western region and seeds three through five in the Eastern region in the advanced to their respective region's play-in tournament, with two teams from the West and one team from the East advancing to the season playoffs.

Regular season 
The 2021 schedule was released on February 20, 2021, and the regular season began on April 16.

East region

West region

May Melee 
The May Melee was the first of four midseason tournaments of the season. Qualifiers began on April 16 and concluded on May 1. The regional knockouts began on May 2, and the May Melee tournament between the top two teams from each region began on May 7.

Qualifiers 

East region

 

West region

Regional knockouts 

East region

West region

Tournament weekend

June Joust 
The June Joust was the second of four midseason tournaments of the season. For the tournament, four heroes were banned from all qualifying and tournament matches: Tracer, Sombra, Reinhardt, and Zenyatta. Qualifiers began on May 21 and concluded on June 5. The regional knockouts began on June 6, and the May Melee tournament between the top two teams from each region began on June 11.

Qualifiers 

East region

 

West region

Regional knockouts 

East region

West region

Tournament weekend

Summer Showdown 
The Summer Showdown was the third of four midseason tournaments of the season. Qualifiers began on June 25 and concluded on July 10. The regional knockouts began on July 11, and the tournament began on July 16.

Qualifiers 

East region

 

West region

Regional knockouts 

East region

West region

Tournament weekend

Countdown Cup 
The Countdown Cup was the last of four midseason tournaments of the season. For the tournament, four heroes were banned from all qualifying and tournament matches: Echo, Ashe, Sigma, and Lúcio. Qualifiers began on July 30 and concluded on August 14. The regional knockouts take place on August 15, and the tournament began on August 19.

Qualifiers 

East region

 

West region

Regional knockouts 

East region

West region

Tournament weekend

Postseason

Play-in tournaments 
The play-in tournaments were two regional single-elimination tournaments that took place September 4–5 and advanced two Western teams and one Eastern team to the season playoffs. In the Western region, seeds four through nine, based on regular season standings, advanced to the Western play-in tournament. The first round was contested by seeds six through nine, with the sixth seed selecting either the eighth or ninth seed as their opponent. The winners of the first round advanced to the finals, with the fourth seed choosing their opponent from the winners of the first round. In the Eastern region, seeds three through five, based on regular season standings, advanced to the Eastern play-in tournament. The fourth and fifth seed competed in the first round, and the winner of the first round faced the third seed in the final. In both regions, the winner of the finals advanced to the season playoffs.

Brackets 

East region

West region

Playoffs 

The playoffs were a double-elimination tournament contested by eight teams – five from the West region and three from the East region. All matches in season playoffs, aside from the final match, took place from September 21 to 24. The final two teams remaining in the tournament advanced to the Grand Finals, which took place on September 25. Playoff matches, aside from the Grand Finals, were planned to take place live at Esports Stadium Arlington in Arlington, Texas, while the Grand Finals was planned to take place at the Galen Center in Los Angeles, California; however, the OWL announced on August 25, 2021, that all playoff matches, including the Grand Finals, would not be played in a live format due to increasing risks of COVID-19 and the Delta variant. Instead, the West region playoff teams travelled to the University of Hawaiʻi at Mānoa, while the East region teams played in their home country, to minimize latency between competing teams.

Bracket

Notable events

Chinese teams boycott Saebyeolbe 
On April 12, 2021, while streaming on Twitch, Seoul Dynasty player Park "Saebyeolbe" Jong-ryeol commented about frustration trying to appeal to a Chinese audience while streaming on the Chinese streaming platform DouYu. In an English translation, Park said during his Twitch stream, "I can't say Taiwan and [Hong Kong]. At all. They (China) don't recognize them as countries. I got into so much trouble for saying their names. Make it make sense. What are you talking about, 'One China?' So I objected to that and all the managers said, 'If you want to earn Chinese money, you have to become a Chinese dog.' So that's what I'm doing right now. I can even say, 'Thanks for subscribing' in Chinese. Aren't I good at Chinese?"

Two days after the comments, Park apologized via a handwritten note on Instagram. Nearly three weeks after the apology, the four Chinese teams of the Overwatch League — the Shanghai Dragons, Chengdu Hunters, Hangzhou Spark, and Guangzhou Charge — announced that they would not participate in any Overwatch League event in which Park was present. On May 6, 2021, the Overwatch League issued a statement announcing that the Chinese teams would no longer be boycotting Park nor the Seoul Dynasty. As of August 18, 2021, Park has not appeared in a match since the incident.

Soft salary cap investigation
In July 2021, Dot Esports reported that the Civil Conduct Task Force of the United States Department of Justice antitrust division was investigating whether or not the league's soft salary cap policy violated the Sherman Antitrust Act of 1890, as the player's are not unionized. In October 2021, Sports Business Journal reported that the OWL would be eliminating their competitive balance tax and maximum salary caps.

League sponsorship pulled 

In July 2021, the California Department of Fair Employment and Housing (DFEH) filed a lawsuit against Activision Blizzard for sexual harassment and discrimination taking place within the Blizzard workplace. Two weeks after the filing, Overwatch League partners Coca-Cola, Kellogg's, State Farm, and T-Mobile announced that they would be reassessing their partnership with the league, and all branding of the aforementioned companies were removed from the league's website. Later, Kellogg's stated they "will not be moving forward" with their sponsorship of the Overwatch League. Additionally, Sports Business Journal observed that IBM branding was removed from all Overwatch League media, including the league's official partners' page and power rankings. In mid-August 2021, the only sponsor present during Overwatch League broadcasts was voice-over-Internet Protocol software company TeamSpeak.

Awards

Individual awards

Role Stars

Source:

Media 
The season marked the second year of the Overwatch League's the three-year broadcast contract with YouTube, which did not include broadcast rights for China. For the 2021 season, YouTube introduced clipping functionality for their videos and allowed OWL games to be rendered in 4K resolution.

Under a new, multi-year contract, Bilibili obtained production and broadcast rights in China. Bilibili has a similar deal with Riot Games' League of Legends international competitions and, prior to the deal with the Overwatch League, secured hosting rights for Overwatch Contenders and Overwatch Open Division in China. Activision Blizzard renewed a deal for TV-exclusive rights to the Overwatch League in Germany, Austria, and Switzerland with Sport1; the multi-year contract was signed after their two-year deal with Sport1 concluded.

Winnings 

May Melee

June Joust

Summer Showdown

Countdown Cup

Season playoffs

References

External links 
 
 

 
Overwatch
Overwatch League season 2021